Bayfield High School is a co-educational high school in Dunedin, New Zealand. It was established in 1961 and is located on the corner of Musselburgh Rise and Shore Street, adjacent to the Otago Harbour. The school currently has approximately 600 students.

Facilities

Stage one of a new gymnasium was opened on 22 August 2008, after teachers approached the Ministry of Education in 2007 requesting an upgrade to undersized facilities.

House system
There are five houses with approximately 160 students in each house. The houses are Anderson, Begg, Herron, Ross and Somerville. All houses except Herron are named after the founding fathers of the district; Herron is named after the first principal Jack Herron. Each house has four tutor groups with a tutor teacher and associate teacher. Each house has a dean that looks after the house.

Curriculum and culture
The school is well known throughout the local community for having a strong music department. Students perform regularly in the wider community and in 2006 the school Orchestra, Jazz Band and Madrigal Choir flew to Sydney, Australia to play in the Sydney Opera House with a company called United World Concert Tours. The Colorado Springs Youth Symphony and the Honolulu Community Concert Band, from Hawaii, also performed. Another tour to Melbourne, Australia took place in June 2010 for 30 students and their supporters.

Bayfield High School has an ESOL department for overseas fee paying students. In 2010 there were 40 overseas students enrolled from Japan, China, Brazil, Germany, Slovakia, Switzerland, Taiwan, France and Korea. The overseas students have specialist English Language classes together with regular classes. They also enjoy trips away from school including visits to Fiordland, the Queenstown Ski area and Mount Cook.

History
Bayfield's canteen was featured in the Otago Daily Times on 27 April 2007. The canteen was run by catering students of the school, who aimed to make the canteen food healthier: "We’re trying to bring in healthier food — sushi, wraps, filled rolls, soup and salads. We’ve already started to phase out some of the fatty foods like chips and lollies because we want to be healthy. We want to make our name as the healthiest canteen in Otago."

Notable alumni and staff
David Bain, acquitted of murder after a retrial in 2009
David Benson-Pope, former cabinet minister, was a teacher at the school.
Daniel Borgman, director of The Weight of Elephants
Len Cook, former National Statistician of the United Kingdom
Anna Grimaldi, para-athlete, Paralympic gold medallist.
Danyon Loader, Olympic Gold medallist

References

External links

Secondary schools in Dunedin
New Zealand secondary schools of Nelson plan construction
Educational institutions established in 1961
1961 establishments in New Zealand